Computers & Geosciences is a scientific journal published monthly by Elsevier on behalf of the International Association for Mathematical Geosciences. It contains research and review papers in computing applied to geosciences. Its impact factor is 3.372.

See also
Geocomputation
Geoinformatics
Geomathematics

References

External links
 
 Official source code repository

Computer science journals
Earth and atmospheric sciences journals